Linx were a British soul/Brit funk band consisting of David Grant (lead vocals), Bob Carter (keyboards), Andy Duncan (drums), Canute Edwards (guitar), Peter Martin (bass) (aka Sketch) and Junior Giscombe (backing vocals). Carter and Duncan were session musicians who were known for their contribution to Hazel O'Connor's Breaking Glass album and movie.

After their first hit in 1980, the band slimmed down to a duo of Grant and Martin. Peter Martin (the bassist) joined the band 23 Skidoo. Junior Giscombe became a pop singer in his own right.

Overview
Linx had six entries on the UK Singles Chart from mid-1980 until mid-1982. The band's biggest success was "Intuition", which reached number 7 in early 1981. Other hits included "You're Lying" and "So This Is Romance." Linx also contributed the track "Don't Get in My Way" to the influential C81 compilation cassette released by New Musical Express magazine in 1981.

Linx's success with "Intuition" was assisted by a BBC technician's strike, which resulted in only music videos and repeat performances being allowed to be used on Top of the Pops for a period. This led to the video for "Intuition", first played when the song was in the 60's in the music charts, being shown several times. This helped the single reach the Top Ten.

Linx split in early 1983. Grant went on to have a number of solo hits. More recently, he was featured as a vocal coach on the BBC TV show Fame Academy.

Discography

Studio albums

Singles

Compilation albums

References

External links
 Linx at AllMusic.
 Album and Singles Discography at Discogs.

British funk musical groups
British soul musical groups
British rhythm and blues musical groups
Chrysalis Records artists